Louis-Jean Lévesque de Pouilly (1691, Reims - 1750, Paris) was a French philosopher. A member of the Académie des Inscriptions et Belles-Lettres, he founded the ESAD de Reims.

Lévesque de Pouilly studied philosophy and literature in Paris. He was a friend of Nicolas Fréret and Lord Bolingbroke, met Isaac Newton in England, and is likely to have hosted David Hume in Reims.

Works
Dissertation sur l'incertitude de l'histoire des premiers siècles de Rome, 1723
Théorie des sentiments agréables, 1736.

References

1691 births
1750 deaths
Writers from Reims
18th-century French philosophers
French male non-fiction writers
18th-century French male writers